The Shuttle Landing Facility (SLF) also known as Launch and Landing Facility (LLF)  is an airport located on Merritt Island in Brevard County, Florida, United States. It is a part of the Kennedy Space Center and was used by Space Shuttle for landing until July 2011. It was also used for takeoffs and landings for NASA training jets such as the Shuttle Carrier Aircraft and for civilian aircraft.

Starting in 2015, Space Florida manages and operates the facility under a 30-year lease from NASA. In addition to ongoing use by NASA, private companies have been utilizing the SLF since the 2011 end of the Space Shuttle program.

Facilities

(Despite its length, astronaut Jack R. Lousma stated that he would have preferred the runway to be "half as wide and twice as long") Additionally, the SLF has  of paved overruns at each end. The Mate-Demate Device (MDD), for use when the Shuttle was transported by the Shuttle Carrier Aircraft, was located just off the southern end of the runway.

The runway is designated runway 15, or 33, depending on the direction of use. It uses a grooved design to provide drainage and further increase the coefficient of friction. The original groove design was found to actually provide too much friction for the rubber used in the Shuttle's tires, causing failures during several landings. This issue was resolved by grinding down the pavement, reducing the depth of the grooves significantly.

A local nickname for the runway is the "gator tanning facility", as some of the 4,000 alligators living at Kennedy Space Center regularly bask in the sunlight on the runway.

The landing facility is managed by contractor EG&G, which provides air traffic control services, as well as managing potential hazards to landing aircraft, such as bird life.  The Bird Team kept the facility clear of both local and migratory birds during Shuttle landings using pyrotechnics, blank rounds fired from shotguns and a series of 25 propane cannons arranged around the facility.

History and usage

Space Shuttle

Columbia was the first Shuttle to arrive at the SLF via the Shuttle Carrier Aircraft on March 24, 1979.

The runway was first used to land a Space Shuttle on February 11, 1984, when Challenger's STS-41-B mission returned to Earth.  This also marked the first landing of a spacecraft at its launch site.  Prior to this, all Shuttle landings were performed at Edwards Air Force Base in California (with the exception of STS-3, which landed at White Sands Space Harbor) while the landing facility continued testing and Shuttle crews developed landing skills at White Sands and Edwards, where the margin for error is much greater than SLF and its water hazards.  On September 22, 1993, Discovery was the first Space Shuttle to land at night at the SLF on STS-51. A total of 78 Space Shuttle missions landed at the SLF.

The final landing of a Space Shuttle occurred on July 21, 2011 by Atlantis for STS-135. Discovery and Endeavour took off from the SLF on top of the Shuttle Carrier Aircraft for museums in Washington, D.C. and Los Angeles.

Boeing X-37B

In January 2014 it was announced that Boeing would lease the Orbiter Processing Facility at Kennedy Space Center to enable the U.S. Air Force to efficiently land, recover, refurbish, and re-launch the X-37B uncrewed spacecraft. 

In October 2014, NASA signed agreement for the use of the facility, and Boeing upgraded the OPF-1 for the X-37B program.

The X-37B (OTV-4 mission) first used Kennedy Space Center's Shuttle Landing Facility on May 7, 2017 at 11:47 UTC.

Project Morpheus testing
In 2012, NASA's Johnson Space Center's Project Morpheus's first vehicle arrived at KSC. Prior to arrival at KSC and throughout the project, Morpheus vehicle tests were performed at other NASA centers; KSC was the site for advanced testing. Multiple tests, including free flight, were performed at the SLF in 2013–2014. Multiple vehicles and iterations of the vehicles were tested, due to upgrades and damages during this experimental test program. During the August 9, 2012 test at the SLF, a vehicle exploded; no one was injured.

Commercial use
The SLF has also been used by commercial users. Zero Gravity Corporation, which offers flights where passengers experience brief periods of microgravity, has operated from the SLF, as have record-setting attempts by the Virgin Atlantic GlobalFlyer.

The SLF has been the site of high performance automobile testing and speed record attempts. In 2010, NASCAR teams used the facility for vehicle testing. In 2012, Performance Power's Johnny Bohmer drove his Ford GT modified test car at the SLF,  setting the Guinness World Records mark for 'Fastest standing mile – car' with a record , which still stands as of November 2022. Bohmer impressed the fact that the partnership agreement with NASA and the SLF to test the technology and designs and collect engineering data meant that "[B]y NASA allowing us access to a one-of-a-kind facility, we are given the opportunity to explore these technologies and share their benefits."

In 2019, the Gulfstream G650ER of the multinational One More Orbit flight mission recorded the fastest circumnavigation of the Earth via the north and south poles of 46 h 40 min 22 s. The Shuttle Landing Facility served as launch and landing site for the world speed record, certified by the Guinness World Records and the World Air Sports Federation Fédération Aéronautique Internationale.

See also
Cape Canaveral Air Force Station Skid Strip
List of Space Shuttle landing sites

References

External links

Shuttle Landing Facility - NASA.gov fact sheet
Space Shuttle Era: Landing Sites - NASA video on YouTube

Airports in Brevard County, Florida
Space Shuttle program
Kennedy Space Center
Buildings and structures in Merritt Island, Florida
Articles containing video clips
Space Shuttle Emergency Landing Sites